Mapel Airstrip is an airport in South Sudan.

Location
Mapel Airstrip is located in Jur River County, Western Bahr el Ghazal State, near the town of Mapel.

The elevation of Mapel Airstrip is unknown. It has a single, unpaved runway.

Overview
Mapel Airstrip is a small civilian airport that serves the towns of Mapel and Medil. There are no known scheduled airlines serving this airport at this time, but the United Nations Humanitarian Air Service served the field from Rumbek Airport.

External links
 Location of Mapel Airstrip At Google Maps

See also
 Western Bahr el Ghazal
 Bahr el Ghazal
 List of airports in South Sudan

References

Airports in South Sudan
Western Bahr el Ghazal
Bahr el Ghazal